Cynomorium is a genus of parasitic perennial flowering plants in the family Cynomoriaceae. The genus consists of only one species, Cynomorium coccineum (although one of its subspecies is sometimes treated as a separate species). Its placement in the Saxifragales was resolved in 2016 with the help of nuclear, plastid, and mitochondrial sequences obtained from next-generation sequencing. Common names include the misleading Maltese fungus or Maltese mushroom; also desert thumb, red thumb, tarthuth (Bedouin) and suoyang (Chinese). A rare or local species, it grows in dry, rocky or sandy soils, often in salt marshes or other saline habitats close to the coast. It has had a wide variety of uses in European, Arabian and Chinese herbal medicine.

Description
This plant has no chlorophyll and is unable to photosynthesise. It is a geophyte, spending most of its life underground in the form of a rhizome, which is attached to the roots of its host plant; it is a holoparasite, i.e. totally dependent on its host. The low-growing inflorescence emerges (in spring, following winter rain), on a fleshy, unbranched stem (most of which is underground) with scale-like, membranous leaves. It is pollinated by flies, attracted to the plant by its sweet, slightly cabbage-like odour. Once pollinated, the spike turns black. The fruit is a small, indehiscent nut.

In the Mediterranean region, Cynomorium is a parasite of salt-tolerant plants in the Cistaceae (cistus family) or Amaranthaceae (amaranth family); elsewhere it parasitizes Amaranthaceae, Tamaricaceae (tamarisks) and, in China, Nitrariaceae, especially Nitraria sibirica. Other authorities suggest the host plants are saltbushes (Atriplex species, Amaranthaceae).

DNA studies suggest that Cynomorium is not a member of the Balanophoraceae, as previously thought, but more probably belongs to the Saxifragales, possibly near Crassulaceae (stonecrop family). The issue is complicated by the massive horizontal gene transfer between Cynomorium and its different hosts.

Taxonomy 
Long disputed, Cynomorium was placed in the Saxifragales in 2016, but its placement within that order remains uncertain.

Distribution 
Cynomorium coccineum var. coccineum is found in Mediterranean regions, from Lanzarote in the Canary Islands and Mauritania through Tunisia and Bahrain in the south; Spain, Portugal, southern Italy, Sardinia, Sicily, Gozo, Malta and the Eastern Mediterranean. Its range extends as far east as Afghanistan, Saudi Arabia and Iran.

Cynomorium coccineum var. songaricum is found in Central Asia and Mongolia, where it grows at high altitudes. Several authorities consider this to be a separate species, C. songaricum; it is called "suoyang" in China, where it is extensively collected as a herbal remedy for illnesses including sexual worries and nocturnal emissions.

History and historical uses
Sir David Attenborough suggests that, following the reasoning of the "Doctrine of signatures", the phallic shape of the inflorescence suggested to early herbalists that Cynomorium should be used as a cure for erectile dysfunction and other sexual problems. Its colour suggested that it would cure anaemia and other diseases of the blood. It has been used for similar purposes in the east and west of its range: crusaders carried dried spikes to help them recover from their wounds. Other traditional uses have included treatments for apoplexy, dysentery, sexually transmitted diseases, hypertension, vomiting and irregular menstruation.

The city of Kuyu  was also known as Suoyang City (the Chinese name for cynomorium), after the 7th-century general Xue Rengui and his army supposedly survived a siege there by eating the plant. Much later, it was "introduced" (or possibly imported) to China from Mongolia during the Yuan dynasty as a medicinal plant, and is first mentioned by Zhū Dānxī in his Supplement and Expansion of Materia Medica in 1347. It was an ingredient in his recipe for hidden tiger pills, used for impotence and weak legs.

During the 16th century, the Knights of Malta greatly prized the plant and sent samples of it to European royalty. They incorrectly believed it to be a fungus, and it became known as "fungus melitensis", "Maltese mushroom". The Knights jealously guarded "Fungus Rock", a large rock formation, on whose flat top it grew in abundance, just off the coast of Gozo. They even tried smoothing the outcrop's sides to prevent theft of the plants, which was said to be punishable by death. The only access was by a precarious cable car, which was maintained into the early 19th century. The rock is now a nature reserve, so access is still strictly limited.

In the Middle Ages, Arabic physicians called it  "tarthuth" and "the treasure of drugs". An aqrabadhin, or medical formulary, compiled by Al-Kindi in the 9thcentury lists tarthuth as an ingredient in a salve to relieve skin irritation; later, Rhazes (Al-Razi) recommended it to cure piles, nosebleeds, and dysfunctional uterine bleeding. In Saudi Arabia, an infusion made from the ground, dried mature spike has been used to treat colic and stomach ulcers. It was eaten on long journeys by the Bedouin people, who would clean and peel the fresh spikes and eat the crisp white interior, which is said to be succulent and sweet, with a flavour of apples and a pleasantly astringent effect. It is also relished by camels.

It has often been used as a "famine food" (last reported during the 19thcentury in the Canary Islands). Among many other uses it has been used as a contraceptive, a toothpaste, and a non-fading crimson fabric dye.

Active ingredients
Cynomorium contains anthocyanic glycosides, triterpenoid saponins, and lignans.

Cynomorium coccineum var. coccineum from Sardinia was found to contain gallic acid and cyanidin-3-O-glucoside as the main constituents.

References

Bibliography 

 
 Parasitic Plant Connection : Cynomoriaceae (includes distribution map and links to many online photographs)
 eFloras.org, Flora of China : Cynomoriaceae
 eFloras.org, Flora of Pakistan : Cynomoriaceae
 eFloras.org, South China Botanical Garden Herbarium : Cynomoriaceae
 Harvard Flora of China 13:434 (2007)
 RGB Kew, World Checklist of Selected Plant Families : Cynomorium
 DELTA : Cynomoriaceae Lindl. 
 See also Balanophoraceae L.C. & A. Rich. 
 MOBOT : Cynomoriaceae (placed under Saxifragales)
 MOBOT : Cynomoriaceae (placed under Rosales)
 GRIN : Family: Cynomoriaceae Engl. ex Lindl.
 ITIS : Cynomoriaceae
 NCBI : Cynomoriaceae
 Tropicos: Cynomorium

External links
 
 
Parasitic Plant Connection: Cynomoriaceae

Parasitic plants
Saxifragales
Monotypic Saxifragales genera